The 1967 Tour de France was the 54th edition of the Tour de France, one of cycling's Grand Tours. Thirteen national teams of ten riders competed, with three French teams, two Belgian, two Italian, two Spanish, one each from Germany, United Kingdom and the Netherlands, and a Swiss/Luxembourgian team.

The Tour was marred by the fatal collapse of Tom Simpson on the slopes of Mont Ventoux.

Teams

The previous years, the Tour had been contested by trade teams. Tour director Félix Lévitan held the team sponsors responsible for the riders' strike in the 1966 Tour de France, and therefore the formula was changed, and the national teams returned. The Tour started with 130 cyclists, divided into 13 teams of 10 cyclists.

The teams entering the race were:

National teams

 France
 Germany
 Belgium
 Spain
 Great Britain
 Italy
 Netherlands
 Switzerland/Luxembourg

Secondary national teams

 Red Devils (Belgium)
 Esperanza (Spain)
 Primavera (Italy)
 Bleuets de France
 Coqs de France

Route and stages

The 1967 Tour de France started on 29 June, and was the first to have a prologue, a short individual time trial prior to stage racing, held in the evening, adding to the occasion. There were had two rest days, in Belfort and Sète. Whereas in previous years the trend had been that the Tour became shorter, in 1967 it was longer, with 4779 km.

Race overview

The prologue was won by Spanish José María Errandonea, with Raymond Poulidor in second place, six seconds behind. In the next few stages, the lead in the general classification changed hands several times, but the margins between the top favourites were small.

In the first part of the fifth stage, in Belgium, a group of fourteen cyclists including some Belgian cyclists escaped early in the stage. On the advice of his teammate Jean Stablinski, Roger Pingeon bridged the gap and joined the escaped group. The group stayed away, and Pingeon escaped 60 km before the finish, riding alone until the end of the stage. Pingeon won the stage, and also became the leader of the general classification.

Pingeon's lead was not challenged in the sixth stage, but he lost it in the seventh stage to his teammate Raymond Riotte, after Riotte was in a group that escaped. In the eighth stage, Riotte lost considerable time, and Pingeon was back in the lead. On that stage, Raymond Riotte lost more than 11 minutes, also because of a fall and mechanical problems, and announced that he would ride the rest of the Tour in support of Pingeon.

Pingeon gained a few seconds in the ninth stage after a split in the peloton. In the tenth stage, Poulidor helped Pingeon over the major climbs, and after that stage Pingeon had a margin of more than four minutes over the next rider, Désiré Letort from the Bleuets team.

There were few changes in the general classification in the next two stages. The thirteenth stage was run in hot weather, and featured high climbs. During the climb of the Ventoux, Tom Simpson died. Unaware of what happened behind them, Jan Janssen won the stage, closely followed by Roger Pingeon, who extended his lead.

The riders in the peloton decided to ride the fourteenth stage in dedication of Tom Simpson, and let his teammate Barry Hoban win the stage.

In the sixteenth stage in the Pyrenees, Julio Jiménez won back a few minutes, and was now in second place behind Pingeon, 123 seconds behind. In the twentieth stage, with a finish on top of the Puy-de-Dôme, Jiménez won back some more time, and was now 1 minute and 39 seconds behind Pingeon. This was not enough to put Pingeon's victory in danger; the Tour ended with an individual time trial, and Pingeon rode it much better than Jiménez, and won the Tour de France of 1967.

Doping
After the death of Tom Simpson on stage 13, there were accusations of doping use. The organisation decided to increase the doping controls, not only in the Tour but also in the simultaneously run Tour de l'Avenir. The Tour de France gave no positive tests, but several riders from the Tour de l'Avenir were disqualified.

Classification leadership and minor prizes

There were several classifications in the 1967 Tour de France, two of them awarding jerseys to their leaders. The most important was the general classification, calculated by adding each cyclist's finishing times on each stage. The cyclist with the least accumulated time was the race leader, identified by the yellow jersey; the winner of this classification is considered the winner of the Tour.

Additionally, there was a points classification. In the points classification, cyclists got points for finishing among the best in a stage finish, or in intermediate sprints. The cyclist with the most points lead the classification, and was identified with a green jersey.

There was also a mountains classification. The organisation had categorised some climbs as either first, second, third, or fourth-category; points for this classification were won by the first cyclists that reached the top of these climbs first, with more points available for the higher-categorised climbs. The cyclist with the most points lead the classification, but was not identified with a jersey.

For the team classification, the times of the best three cyclists per team on each stage were added; the leading team was the team with the lowest total time. The riders in the team that led this classification wore yellow caps.

In addition, there was a combativity award, in which a jury composed of journalists gave points after each stage to the cyclist they considered most combative. The split stages each had a combined winner. At the conclusion of the Tour, Désiré Letort won the overall super-combativity award, also decided by journalists by a jury. The Souvenir Henri Desgrange was given to the first rider to pass the memorial to Tour founder Henri Desgrange near the summit of the Col du Galibier on stage 10. This prize was won by Julio Jiménez.

Final standings

General classification

Points classification

Mountains classification

Intermediate sprints classification

Team classification

Notes

References

Bibliography

External links

 
1967
1967 in French sport
1967 in road cycling
June 1967 sports events in Europe
July 1967 sports events in Europe
1967 Super Prestige Pernod